Capt. John S. Pope Farm is a historic tobacco farm complex located near Cedar Grove, Orange County, North Carolina.  The farmhouse was built between 1870 and 1874, and is a two-story, frame I-house with a one-story ell.   It sits on a stone pier foundation, has a triple gable roof, and features stone gable end chimneys.  Also on the property are the contributing well house (c. 1920), washhouse (c. 1875, 1930s), garage / smokehouse (c. 1900, c. 1920), flower house (c. 1900), two corn cribs (c. 1900, c. 1930), feed barn (c. 1900), tobacco ordering/stripping house (c. 1935), two curing barns (c. 1955), stick shed (c. 1950), five tobacco barns (c. 1875-1955), a spring-fed well (c. 1909), workshop (c. 1960), a small log building (c. 1880), two wood sheds (c. 1920, c. 1950), and the surrounding agricultural landscape.

It was listed on the National Register of Historic Places in 2013.

References

External links
Capt. John S. Pope Farm website

Farms on the National Register of Historic Places in North Carolina
Houses completed in 1874
Buildings and structures in Orange County, North Carolina
National Register of Historic Places in Orange County, North Carolina